Euchaetes is a genus of moths in the family Erebidae. It was described by Thaddeus William Harris in 1841.

Species

 Euchaetes albaticosta (Dyar, 1912)
 Euchaetes albicosta (Walker, 1855)
 Euchaetes antica (Walker, 1856)
 Euchaetes bicolor (Rothschild, 1935)
 Euchaetes bolteri (Stretch, 1885)
 Euchaetes castalla (Barnes & McDunnough, 1910)
 Euchaetes cressida (Dyar, 1913)
 Euchaetes egle (Drury, 1773) – milkweed tiger moth
 Euchaetes elegans (Stretch, 1874)
 Euchaetes expressa (H. Edwards, 1884)
 Euchaetes fusca (Rothschild, 1910)
 Euchaetes gigantea (Barnes & McDunnough, 1910)
 Euchaetes mitis Schaus, 1910
 Euchaetes pannycha (Dyar, 1918)
 Euchaetes perlevis (Grote, 1882)
 Euchaetes polingi (Cassino, 1928)
 Euchaetes promathides (Druce, 1894)
 Euchaetes psara (Dyar, 1907)
 Euchaetes rizoma (Schaus, 1896)
 Euchaetes zella (Dyar, 1903)

References
Arctiidae genus list at Butterflies and Moths of the World of the Natural History Museum

External links
 A monographic revision of Euchaetes Harris (Lepidoptera: Erebidae: Arctiinae) Hendrickson, Heather Marie (2014)

Phaegopterina
Moth genera